Joseph Jackson (11 November 1904 – 13 June 1981) was a French sprinter. He competed in the men's 200 metres at the 1924 Summer Olympics.

References

External links
 

1904 births
1981 deaths
Athletes (track and field) at the 1924 Summer Olympics
Athletes (track and field) at the 1928 Summer Olympics
French male sprinters
Olympic athletes of France
Place of birth missing
20th-century French people